Air vice-marshal John Denis Breakey  & Bar (19 May 1899 – 8 January 1965) was a senior officer of the Royal Air Force. He began his military career in the Royal Naval Air Service during World War I. As the RNAS was merged into the Royal Air Force, he scored nine aerial victories as a fighter pilot. He served throughout the interwar period and into World War II, rising to air vice marshal.

Biography
Breakey was born in Sheffield, England.

First World War
On 3 June 1917 he was appointed a probationary temporary flight officer in Royal Naval Air Service (on the same day as Frederick Britnell). On 10 October 1917 he was made a flight sub-lieutenant, and in November 1917 joined No. 3 Squadron RNAS flying the Sopwith Camel. On 1 April 1918 the Royal Naval Air Service and Royal Flying Corps were amalgamated into the Royal Air Force, and No. 3 Squadron RNAS became No. 203 Squadron RAF, and Breakey was promoted to lieutenant. On 19 August 1918 he was appointed temporary captain, while serving as a flight commander in 203 Squadron.

On 8 February 1919 he was awarded the Distinguished Flying Cross. His citation read:

By the end of the war he was credited with nine aerial victories:

Inter-war career
On 13 June 1919 he joined No. 47 Squadron RAF which was sent to Southern Russia to the support the White Army against the Bolsheviks in the Russian Civil War. On 1 August 1919 he was granted a permanent commission as a lieutenant in the RAF. On 12 July 1920 he was awarded a bar to his Distinguished Flying Cross for his service in South Russia.

From 1 February 1921 Breakey served as a test pilot at the Aeroplane and Armament Experimental Establishment, and on 24 July 1923 was appointed a flight commander in No. 22 Squadron. On 1 July 1924 he was promoted from flying officer to flight lieutenant, and on 15 September was posted to the Inland Area Aircraft Depot, RAF Henlow.
 
On 1 February 1929 he was reassigned to No. 204 Squadron, a flying boat squadron, flying the Supermarine Southampton, based at RAF Mount Batten. He was transferred to No. 205 Squadron, based at Singapore, on 7 January 1930, and from 16 May 1931 served on the staff of RAF Singapore. From 3 April 1933 he was a Supernumerary officer at the RAF Depot.

He successfully sat the Officers' Promotion Examinations in March 1934, and from 3 April 1934 served on the staff of the Marine & Armament Experimental Establishment (M&AEE). He was promoted to squadron leader on 1 February 1935 and was appointed to command of No. 201 Squadron, based at RAF Calshot, flying the Southampton II, and later the Saro London. He left No. 201 Squadron on 20 September 1937 and on 4 October was appointed the Directorate of Intelligence at the Air Ministry. On 1 July 1938 he was promoted to wing commander.

Second World War
Between July 1940 and July 1941 he served in the Directorate of Operational Requirements, and appointed a temporary group captain on 1 December 1940. In May 1941 he was appointed acting air commodore, with the war substantive rank of group captain on 26 November. On 20 April 1943 he was appointed acting air vice-marshal, and served as Assistant Chief of the Air Staff (Technical Requirements). He was appointed (temporary) air commodore on 1 June 1943, with the permanent rank of group captain from 1 December 1943.

On 1 January 1944 he was made a Companion of the Order of the Bath (CB), and was granted the rank of war substantive air commodore on 20 April.

Postwar career
In September 1945 he was appointed Air Officer Commanding, No. 222 Group, Ceylon, and from 1 October 1945 was Air Officer Commanding, Air Headquarters Malaya (AHQ Malaya). He was promoted to air commodore on 1 January 1946, and to air vice-marshal on 1 July 1947. On 13 January 1948 Breakey was appointed Air Officer in Charge of Administration, Bomber Command. From March 1951 he served as Air Officer Commanding No. 21 (Training) Group, and was appointed Head of the Air Force Staff at the British Joint Services Mission at Washington, D.C. on 1 August 1951, staying in that post until February 1954. He retired from the RAF on 10 May 1954.

Air Vice-Marshal Breakey died on 8 January 1965.

References

External links
 

1899 births
1965 deaths
Royal Naval Air Service aviators
Royal Naval Air Service personnel of World War I
Royal Air Force personnel of World War I
British World War I flying aces
Royal Air Force personnel of World War II
Royal Air Force air marshals
Companions of the Order of the Bath
Recipients of the Distinguished Flying Cross (United Kingdom)
Military personnel from Sheffield